Trans European Aviation was a British charter airline which operated from 1954 until closure in 1963. With the introduction of the larger Lockheed Constellation to its services, the airline name was changed in 1961 to Trans European Airways.

History

The airline was formed in early 1954 to operate charter flights from Swansea Airport with two de Havilland Dragon Rapide aircraft. In early 1960 the operations base was transferred to Coventry Airport and a Bristol Freighter, previously owned by Air Condor, was acquired in October that year. This larger aircraft was used to operate both freight and passenger charter flights.

In 1961 the airline decided to enter the inclusive-tour market when it tried to acquire a Lockheed Constellation from Cubana. The deal fell through but in May 1961 it took delivery of the first of three Constellations, which were based at London Gatwick Airport. The airline operated charters and inclusive tour flights from London and other major United Kingdom airports to Mediterranean resorts. It also operated inclusive tour flights from West Berlin. In August 1963 the airline ceased operating.

Fleet
 de Havilland Dragon Rapide
 Bristol Freighter
 Lockheed Constellation

See also
 List of defunct airlines of the United Kingdom

References

 

Defunct airlines of the United Kingdom
Airlines established in 1959
Airlines disestablished in 1962